Bexhill is a small village in New South Wales, Australia. As of 2006, the town had a population of 472 people. It is on the Murwillumbah railway line and on Bangalow Road.

Attractions 
Bexhill is well known for its pleasant open air cathedral which is managed by volunteers of the Uniting Church. The "cathedral" has attractive native gardens and overlooks a large length of valley and hills along Coopers Creek. It is well used for wedding services and special events.

The village also contains an old brick pit which is officially closed for recreational purposes due to metal contaminated water naturally leached from the surrounding rocks but the attractive colour of the lake in the pit and Bexhills hot summer weather mean that many people swim there despite the danger.

Geography 
The village is located on the end of a ridge of basalt hills. The village itself is located on sedimentary rocks of the Clarence Moreton Basin and is surrounded by the Wilsons River and Coopers Creek flood plains.

History 
Bexhill, established in the early 19th century, was the central point of the early North Coast of New South Wales. In the 19th century Bexhill was known as Baldhill.

Bexhill's early production was red cedar logging, its close proximity to Boat Harbour made the floating of logs an easy task during flood waters. The Bexhill school (established around 1850) was subject to easy flooding as well, and was eventually relocated to higher ground. After the Federation of Australia the population of Bexhill began to dwindle. The trades it produced were no longer as vital and people started to migrate to more lively parts of the far north coast. With the population slowly moving out, parts of Bexhill began to close. The post office which brought the surrounding areas its post closed down, relocating to Lismore. The Bexhill Brick works which produced the bricks for the far north coast closed down towards the end of the 1990s, unable to keep up with the production of bricks from Coffs Harbour and Newcastle.

References

External links
 Northern Rivers Geology Blog - Bexhill

Towns in New South Wales
Northern Rivers
City of Lismore